was a Japanese sprinter. Aged 15 she competed in the 100 m and 4 × 100 m event at the 1932 Summer Olympics and placed fifth in the relay.

In 1935 Watanabe married the founder of Chukyo University Seimei Umemura. After that she changed her last name to Umemura (梅村) and taught physical education at Chukyo University.

References

1916 births
2010 deaths
Place of birth missing
Japanese female sprinters
Japanese female long jumpers
Olympic female sprinters
Olympic athletes of Japan
Athletes (track and field) at the 1932 Summer Olympics
Japan Championships in Athletics winners
20th-century Japanese women